Phutunqu (Aymara for a small vessel or a hole, pit, crater, also spelled Phutunkhu) is a  mountain in the Bolivian Andes. It is located in the Chuquisaca Department, Azurduy Province, Tarvita Municipality. It lies west of the San Antonio River which is a left tributary of the Pillku Mayu (Quechua for "red river").

References 

Mountains of Chuquisaca Department